("Unredeemed Galicia") or  ("Outer" or "External Galicia"), also spelled as  and  and also known as  or  ("Eastern Strip"), is a term used for all Galician-speaking territories located outside of Galicia. These are all located in Spain, in either Asturias or Castile and León.

There have been several attempts from these territories to join Galicia. An example is Porto de Sanabria, a small village where, in 2018, a vote was organized to join to the region due to the lack of response from the government of Castile and León to requests from locals to fix a road. 202 people voted in favor, 19 against and 6 did a blank vote. However, this vote did not intend any official change and was only made to know the opinion of the inhabitants.

Another example was that of El Bierzo, a comarca where more people prefer to join Galicia than to stay in Castile and León. There are people who have proposed to turn it into a new province of Spain and join it to Galicia. This initiative became more serious when a request was sent in 2021 to the Xunta de Galicia asking it to recognize El Bierzo as a new province of Galicia. This proposal was rejected by the Spanish prominent parties PP and PSOE.

See also
 Pan-nationalism
 Galicianism
 Galician nationalism
 Galician independence movement
 Gallaecia
 Basque Country (greater region)
 Catalan Countries

References

Galician nationalism
Irredentism
Galician language
National unifications
Pan-nationalism
Geography of Asturias
Geography of Castile and León